Valdepeñas de la Sierra is a municipality located in the province of Guadalajara, Castile-La Mancha, Spain. According to the 2006 census (INE), the municipality has a population of 200 inhabitants.

References

External links 
 

Municipalities in the Province of Guadalajara